Elfrida De Renne Barrow (1884–1970) was an author and poet who has been honored as a Georgia Woman of Achievement. Barrow joined the Georgia Historical Society in 1920 as a curator and one of the first women allowed into the organization. In her years as curator, some of her articles were published in the journal, and she also began to have her poetry published.

Poetry 
In 1920, Barrow co-founded The Poetry Society of Georgia with four other women, calling themselves the "Prosodists." The women brought poet and editor Harriet Monroe to Savannah to review their poetry, leading to Monroe's journal Poetry featuring Barrow's poetry. The journal continued to publish Barrow's poetry for many years.

Wormsloe Foundation 
In 1930, Barrow took over her brother's mortgage at the Wormsloe Plantation, where the family had upheld a tradition of printing publications and building a library. When Barrow and her husband moved to Athens, she made the library collection available to the University of Georgia. In 1951, Barrow founded the Wormsloe Foundation, turning over the majority of the publications.

Works 
 Anchored Yesterdays:The Log Book of Savannah's Voyage Across a Georgia Century: in Ten Watches

References 

1884 births
1970 deaths
American women poets
20th-century American poets
20th-century American women writers